The Treasure of the Lake is one of the two posthumously published novels by H. Rider Haggard featuring Allan Quatermain.

Plot Outline
Allan Quatermain finds a village in the middle of the Dark Continent ruled by a huge, pale man with a strange knowledge of future events.

Reception
E. F. Bleiler described The Treasure of the Lake as "a good adventure story, obviously influenced by the work of James Frazer".

References

External links
Complete book at Project Gutenberg

Novels by H. Rider Haggard
1926 British novels
1926 fantasy novels
Fiction set in 1873
Novels published posthumously